Morgan Keaton served in the California State Assembly for the 70th district from 1927 to 1931. During World War I he served in the United States Army.

References

United States Army personnel of World War I
Republican Party members of the California State Assembly
20th-century American politicians
1891 births
1981 deaths